Firooz Bahram High School (دبیرستان فیروز بهرام) is one of Tehran's oldest high schools still in operation.

History
Built in 1932, it was constructed on the property of Zoroastrians such as Ardeshir Kiamanesh. The school was named after an Iranian Zoroastrian that died in the Mediterranean in World War I. The school's establishment was supported by the then Zoroastrian representative in the Majles, Keikhosrow Shahrokh.

Notables

Seyyed Hossein Nasr (President of Sharif University) went to Firuz Bahram High School before leaving for the United States A Prime Minister of Iran, Chancellor of Tehran University, and Ezatollah Negahban (Iran's father of Archeology) also are among the alumni of this school. The school was not the first Zoroastrian high school in Tehran however. That credit is given to Jamshid Jam (جمشيد جم) High School built in 1906.

Kamaloddin Jenab, one of Iran's pioneers of nuclear physics was director of the school for a while.

Architecture
The architecture of the building is clearly that of the Qajar era of Iran.

The school is a historical landmark and cultural heritage of Tehran today.

See also
Iranian Architecture
Nikan High School
Razi High School
Alborz High School
Zoroastrians in Iran

References

External links

Official website

Educational institutions established in 1932
High schools in Iran
Architecture in Iran
School buildings completed in 1932
Schools in Tehran
1932 establishments in Iran